Pakem is a district (kapanewon) in Sleman Regency, Yogyakarta Special Region, Indonesia.

Localities
 Srowolan

References 

Sleman Regency
Districts of the Special Region of Yogyakarta